Rotary Australia World Community Service (RAWCS) is an Australian non-profit public company controlled by Australian Rotarians. Its purpose is: “Within the areas of focus of Rotary International, to enhance support services to Australian Rotarians and Rotary Clubs to assist disadvantaged communities and individuals with humanitarian aid projects.”  Every Australian Rotary District is represented through their District Governor who is a member of the Company. This membership elects a Board of Directors to govern the company on their behalf.

Funding Schemes
RAWCS is registered as a charity with the Australian Charities and Not-for-profits Commission.   It undertakes its work through three tax-deductible funds:

• Rotary Australia Overseas Aid Fund assists local Rotary Clubs or Rotary Districts in providing sustainable improvement aid in developing countries as identified by the Australian Government’s Department of Foreign Affairs and Trade or for short term relief for disasters. In 2020, it supported 376 overseas projects delivering humanitarian aid in 17 countries.

• Rotary Australian Benevolent Society (RABS) assists Rotary Clubs and Rotary Districts within Australia to respond to needs within their own communities and to gain tax deductibility for donations made to their registered project. In 2020, it supported 156 projects, including 94 compassionate grants to Australians in need. Rotary Australia Compassionate Grants Projects is a subset of the RABS Projects and was established to provide matching funding on a dollar-for-dollar basis with Rotary Clubs. This project type was made possible by AUD 2,000,000 donated by philanthropist Dick Smith’s Trust.  Matching grants are distributed to disadvantaged Australians identified by local Rotary Clubs or Rotary Districts as being in need within their local or wider community.

• Rotary Australia Relief Fund (RARF) provides a rapid response to national appeals and disbursing funds to appropriate aid projects. RARF projects have included collecting donations for bushfire relief following the catastrophic 2019-2020 bushfires. As of 2020, the fund had collected in excess of AUD 1.4 million for distribution in bushfire-ravaged communities.

In response to the 2017-2019 Australian drought, RAWCS has partnered with the Australian Government to distribute AUD6.5 million in cash grants to drought-impacted families through the Drought Community Support Initiative. It has also been involved in the delivery of the AUD 5 million Drought Communities Outreach Program to farming families impacted by the drought through the provision of information events and AUD 500 debit cards to eligible farming households.

RAWCS has been involved in Rotary projects to respond to the COVID-19 pandemic in Australia, particularly the manufacture of protective clothing for frontline health workers.  
 
Donations through RAWCS in 2020 totaled AUD 24,648,693.

Rotarians Against Malaria
Rotarians Against Malaria (RAM) is a Rotary organization that operates under the umbrella of RAWCS.   RAM was started in the early 1990s from a proposal by Dr Brian Hanley of the Rotary Club of Brookvale (New South Wales) who was concerned about the surge in malaria incidence after the discontinuation of DDT-based malaria control programs.   It provides supplies, equipment and volunteers to support the elimination of malaria in Australia's region. It has projects in Papua New Guinea, Solomon Islands, Vanuatu, Timor Leste and West Timor (Indonesia). Projects include the supply of insecticide-treated mosquito nets and funding of staff to provide malaria diagnostic tests and antimalarial medication.  
In 2020, RAM entered into a partnership with the Global Fund and other organizations to form the Malaria Elimination in Melanesia and Timor-Leste Initiative (MEMTI). This involves an international campaign to raise a significant amount of funds to enhance malaria elimination programs in its partner countries.
RAM also supports research to develop and trial a malaria vaccine by the Griffith University Institute of Glycomics.

Donations in Kind
Donations in Kind (DIK) is a Rotary organization that operates under umbrella of RAWCS and was established in 1962.  Its purpose is to collect valuable and usable goods and consumables no longer required in the Australian health and education institutions and distribute them to developing nations and other areas of need. By facilitating the repurposing of discarded useful equipment, it reduces waste and increases the material well-being of developing nations and other areas of need. Recipient nations include countries of the South Pacific, Africa, the Indian subcontinent, South East Asia and South America.
DIK has major storage facilities in Brisbane, Sydney, Melbourne, Geelong and Adelaide and smaller satellite storage areas in Western Australia and regional areas.   These facilities are managed and staffed by volunteers. In 2020, DIK transported 54 shipping containers of goods to 21 countries with a value in excess of AUD 3.87 million, and over 6,000 volunteer hours went into the program.

See also 
Australian Rotary Health

References

External links 
Rotary Australia World Community Service 

Rotarians Against Malaria 

Donations in Kind 

Charities based in Australia
Health charities in Australia
Rotary International